Yulmu-cha or is a tea made of roasted, powdered yulmu (grains of Coix lacryma-jobi var. ma-yuen), sometimes mixed with nuts such as walnut. The tea, usually served hot, is also often sold through vending machines in South Korea.

See also 
 Traditional Korean tea

References 

Herbal tea
Korean tea